"I Swear" is a song by Nigerian hip hop recording artist Ice Prince. It was released as the fourth single from his second studio album, Fire of Zamani (2013). The song features American rapper French Montana and Nigerian singer Shaydee. It was produced by Chopstix and released under Chocolate City. It debuted at number 10 on MTV Base's Official Naija Top 10 chart.

Background and recording
French Montana's verse was recorded at Big Daddy's Studio in New York City, while the rest of the song was recorded in Nigeria. On September 7, 2013, Ice Prince uploaded a video onto YouTube highlighting he and Montana's studio session.

In an interview with HipTV, Ice Prince elaborated on his collaboration with French Montana, saying, "I got introduced to him by a Nigerian guy. We just got introduced backstage at his show and he said this cat's cool. From then on, we went together, we got in the studio, recorded the song. Big shout out to French. He was fasting when he did that song and he was really tired that day. He got in the studio and made it happen." In another video uploaded onto YouTube, Ice Prince said, "I was in the studio with French and we recorded at Big Daddy's Studio. To be in the studio with him and his guys was awesome."

Music video
The music video for "I Swear" was shot in the U.S by J R Saint. It was released on October 8, 2013, a month after the audio release.

Critical reception
Upon its release, the song and its music video were met with positive reviews. Ogagus of Jaguda said the song is a "groovy rap tune that throws good weight behind the fact that Ice Prince can hold his own with the best of them when it comes to rap globally." A writer for The Guardian said, "In the video for new track I Swear, Ice Prince trades rhymes with recording artist French Montana, and it's been shrewdly released in the run up to the MOBOs." Moreover, a writer for OkayAfrica added, "The track sees both MC’s namedropping and channeling some of their contemporaries — French Montana raps some classic Pusha T lines, while Ice Prince asks that we call him the next Drake — over the syncopated beat."

Track listing
 Digital single

Release history

References

2013 songs
2013 singles
French Montana songs
Ice Prince songs
Songs written by French Montana